Pail Padhrar is a combination of two villages in Khushab, Pakistan. The Pail village comes under the administrative jurisdiction of Padhrar Union Council but both are independent villages. Outside the area both names are used as a blended name.

Padhar village is located a few kilometers from Pail. Most people belong to Malik Awan Tribe and are the descendants of Ali Ibn Talib.

Education 
Literacy rate of both villages is 80% (up to matric). Both the villages have proper educational institutions, both state run public as well as private. Moreover, a new private college, namely Shaoor Model College, has opened in Padhrar. Which will further facilitate the people all around. As now they have to go either to Chakwal, Kallar Kahar or Bhochal kalan or to Khushab city for higher education.

Populated places in Khushab District